James Madison (1842 - August 7, 1926) was a Sergeant in the United States Army and a Medal of Honor recipient for his role in the American Civil War. "James Madison" was an alias, his true name was James Congdon.

Congdon enlisted in the Army from Fairport, New York in October 1861, but was discharged for disability in January 1862. Despite this, he re-enlisted in May 1862, and fought at the Battle of Culpeper Court House, where he was wounded. He mustered out with his regiment in June 1865.

Medal of Honor citation
Rank and organization. Sergeant, Company E, 8th New York Cavalry. Place and date: At Waynesboro, Virginia, March 2, 1865. Entered service at: Fairport, New York. Birth: Niagara, New York. Date of issue: March 26, 1865.

Citation:

Recapture of Gen. Crook's headquarters flag.

See also

 List of Medal of Honor recipients
 List of American Civil War Medal of Honor recipients: A–F (For other name of James Congdon)
 List of American Civil War Medal of Honor recipients: M–P

Notes
 Enlisted under the name of James Congdon.

References

External links
 

1842 births
1926 deaths
United States Army Medal of Honor recipients
People from Niagara County, New York
Military personnel from New York (state)
American Civil War recipients of the Medal of Honor
Burials at San Francisco National Cemetery